The United Nations Office of Internal Oversight Services (OIOS) is an independent office in the United Nations Secretariat whose mandate is to "assist the Secretary-General in fulfilling his internal oversight responsibilities in respect of the resources and staff of the Organization." Specifically, activities include internal audit, investigation, monitoring, evaluation, inspection, reporting and support services to the United Nations Secretariat.

Its intended and mandated function is similar to many national government audit organisations, like the Government Accountability Office in the United States. It reports not only to the General Assembly, but also to the Secretary-General.

The current head of the OIOS, Under-Secretary-General Fatoumata Ndiaye of Senegal, was appointed as Under-Secretary-General for Internal Oversight Services for a five-year term starting on 17 October 2019, succeeding Heidi Mendoza of the Philippines.

The office was established in 1994 at the insistence of the United States that the UN take steps to curb waste and corruption, although there are some doubts concerning its effectiveness. Its first head was Under-Secretary-General Karl Theodor Paschke.

Role and function
According to its website:
The Office submits reports to the Secretary-General that provide insight into the effective utilization of the resources of the Organization and the protection of its assets and also makes these reports available to the General Assembly. OIOS adds value by providing world-wide audit, investigation, inspection, programme monitoring, evaluation and consulting services to the United Nations Secretariat and a wide range of United Nations operational funds, programmes and tribunals. OIOS sees itself as an agent of change, committed to help client departments and offices bring about responsible administration of resources and a culture of accountability, transparency, results-orientation and risk awareness.

Under-Secretaries-General

References

External links
 
 OIOS reports posted by the United States mission to the UN
 WikiLeaks
United Nations Procurement Task Force: Interim Report on a Concerned UN Staff Member (PTF-R011-06), 19 Dec 2006 January 12, 2009
United Nations Procurement Task Force: Report on Cogim SPA and Corimec Italiana SPA (PTF-R008-07), 28 Jun 2007 January 12, 2009
United Nations Procurement Task Force: Final Report on a Concerned UN Staff Member and UNOPS Procurement (PTF-R012-07), 15 Aug 2007 January 12, 2009

Organizations established by the United Nations
United Nations Secretariat
Internal audit